Voyager is the first studio album by American band Walter Meego. It consists of 11 tracks, including re-recorded album versions of the previously released tracks "Wanna Be a Star" and "Keyhole". It was released May 27, 2008.  Two of its tracks, "In My Dreams" and "Forever", were featured in episodes of the second season of the television show Ugly Betty.

Track listing
 "Forever" – 4:20
 "Wanna Be a Star" – 3:48
 "Girls" – 3:24
 "More Than I Can Say" – 3:21
 "Tomorrowland" – 3:55
 "Keyhole" – 4:48
 "Lost" – 4:09
 "Letting Go" – 3:47
 "Baby Please" – 3:05
 "Your Love" – 4:08
 "In My Dreams" – 4:25

References

2008 albums
Walter Meego albums
Startime International albums